Blue Hawk is a vertically scrolling shooter video game released in arcades by Dooyong in 1993.

Gameplay 
Blue Hawk is a vertical scrolling military themed shoot 'em up game where you take control of a jet fighter. The game contains stages with various naval and land themes.

You fight a variety of tanks, ships, aircraft, static guns and bosses. While playing, destroyed enemies drop power-ups. The power-ups are similar to those in the company's earlier Pollux game. These include: an automatic shooting power-up (A), plus one (limited) bomb (B), weapon power-up (P), short speed power-up (S), plus one up, homing missiles and various weapon patron power-ups. You can play solo or with a friend.

References

External links
Blue Hawk at Arcade History

1993 video games
Arcade video games
Arcade-only video games
Vertically scrolling shooters
Video games developed in South Korea
Vertically-oriented video games